Margherita Granbassi (born 1 September 1979 in Trieste) is an Italian foil fencer.

Granbassi won the gold medal at the foil 2006 World Fencing Championships after beating Valentina Vezzali 7–6 in the final. Later in the tournament she also won a silver in the team's foil event together with her teammates Elisa Di Francisca, Giovanna Trillini and Valentina Vezzali.  She took the bronze medal on August 11, 2008, at the Beijing Olympics defeating teammate Giovanna Trillini 15–12.

References

External links
 Official web site 
 Personal data 

1979 births
Living people
Sportspeople from Trieste
Italian female fencers
Fencers at the 2004 Summer Olympics
Fencers at the 2008 Summer Olympics
Olympic fencers of Italy
Olympic bronze medalists for Italy
Olympic medalists in fencing
Medalists at the 2008 Summer Olympics
Universiade medalists in fencing
Mediterranean Games silver medalists for Italy
Mediterranean Games medalists in fencing
Competitors at the 2009 Mediterranean Games
Universiade silver medalists for Italy
Fencers of Centro Sportivo Carabinieri
Medalists at the 2005 Summer Universiade
20th-century Italian women
21st-century Italian women